Ture Eskil Hedman (18 December 1895 – 3 August 1950) was a Swedish gymnast who competed in the 1920 Summer Olympics. He was part of the Swedish team that won the all-around Swedish system event.

References

1895 births
1950 deaths
Swedish male artistic gymnasts
Gymnasts at the 1920 Summer Olympics
Olympic gymnasts of Sweden
Olympic gold medalists for Sweden
Olympic medalists in gymnastics
Medalists at the 1920 Summer Olympics
Sportspeople from Stockholm